The 1973 Georgia Tech Yellow Jackets football team represented the Georgia Institute of Technology during the 1973 NCAA Division I football season. The Yellow Jackets were led by head coach Bill Fulcher, in his second and final year with the team, and played their home games at Grant Field in Atlanta. Fulcher resigned as head coach at the end of the season, claiming that he simply didn't enjoy the job.

Schedule

Sources:

References

Georgia Tech
Georgia Tech Yellow Jackets football seasons
Georgia Tech Yellow Jackets football